Pityriasis lichenoides et varioliformis acuta  is a disease of the immune system. It is the more severe version of pityriasis lichenoides chronica. The disease is characterized by rashes and small lesions on the skin. The disease is more common in males and usually occurs in young adulthood, although it has been seen in every age group and every race. It is possible for the disease to go into remission for short periods of time or forever.

Causes
There is no known cause of this disease; There is some evidence associating it with Parvovirus B19.

Diagnosis
It is commonly misdiagnosed as chickenpox or rosacea, or misidentified as a form of Staph infection. The most accurate way to diagnose it is by biopsy.  This disease has not been known to be life-threatening.

Treatment
It is not contagious and currently there is no cure for the disease, although the lesions can be treated with phototherapy as well as antibiotics, including erythromycin, azithromycin and tetracycline. Treatment often involves multiple therapies that address the immune system and bacterial, viral, or dermatological causes.

Eponym
Pityriasis lichenoides et varioliformis acuta is also known as Mucha–Habermann disease. It is named for Rudolf Habermann (1884–1941), a German dermatologist, and Viktor Mucha, an Austrian dermatologist.

See also 
 Cutaneous T-cell lymphoma
 Pityriasis lichenoides
 Parapsoriasis
 List of cutaneous conditions

References

External links 
 

Immune system disorders
Lymphoid-related cutaneous conditions